Ron Bramlett (born October 22, 1979) is a former American track and field athlete who specialized in the 110 metres hurdles. His personal best time is 13.26 seconds, achieved in July 2004 in Lausanne.

Bramlett was born in Frankfurt am Main, Germany, to Ronald and Lurlyn Bramlett.  He graduated from Northeast High School in Clarksville, Tennessee in 1997. He was recruited by Middle Tennessee State University as a 110 m hurdler. After competing one year at MTSU, Bramlett transferred to the University of Alabama, where he won several SEC titles and three NCAA Championships; the 2001-2 NCAA Outdoor Champion for 110 meter hurdles and the 2002 NCAA Indoor Champion for 60 meter hurdles.  He majored in advertising while at the University of Alabama and graduated in 2001.

International competitions

Net Worth: 15mil - 30mil us dollars

References

USA Track & Field Bio

1979 births
Living people
American male hurdlers
Middle Tennessee State University alumni
University of Alabama alumni